A tournament director (TD) is an official at a competitive sporting or gaming event, who typically perform a number of key functions.  The extent of the tournament director's duties varies depending on the size of the tournament, the nature of the competition, and the number of other officials to whom roles can be delegated.

Examples often include:
 Declaring that competition may begin
 Refereeing game play
 Organizing elimination tournament brackets, or pairings of a Swiss system tournament
 Tracking scores and statistics
 Enforcing rules and regulations
 Arbitrating disputes
 Officiating awards ceremonies

Tournament directors often refer to individual sports like tennis and golf, where each competition is organized separately.

In motorsport, the position is called race director. In fencing, the tournament director is known by the French name, directoire technique (commonly abbreviated to DT).

See also
Tournament director (bridge)
Tournament director (chess)
Tournament director (poker)